The Communauté de communes de la Campagne Gâtinaise is a former federation of municipalities (communauté de communes) in the Seine-et-Marne département and in the Île-de-France région of France. It was established on 22 August 1973. It was merged into the new Communauté de communes Gâtinais-Val de Loing in January 2010.

Composition 
The Communauté de communes comprised the following communes:
Arville
Beaumont-du-Gâtinais
Gironville
Ichy
Obsonville

See also
Communes of the Seine-et-Marne department

References 

Former commune communities of Seine-et-Marne